The Honorary Diploma of the Cabinet of Ministers of Ukraine is a government award for many years of hard work, exemplary performance of official duties, personal contribution to economic, scientific, technical, socio-cultural, military, public and other spheres of activity, service to the Ukrainian people in promoting the rule of law and implementation of measures to ensure the protection of the rights and freedoms of citizens, the development of democracy, and the effective operation of executive bodies and local governments.

Recipients

See also
Honorary Diploma of the Verkhovna Rada of Ukraine
Diploma of the Verkhovna Rada of Ukraine 
Awards of Ukraine
Orders, decorations, and medals of Ukraine

References

Ukrainian awards
Badges
Recipients of the Honorary Diploma of the Cabinet of Ministers of Ukraine